Milkeh-ye Shir Khan (also Romanized as Mīlkeh-ye Shīr Khān and Mīlekeh-ye Shīrkhān; also known as Mīlgeh-e Shīrkhān, Mīlkeh, Mīllehgāh, and Mīlleh Gāwāna) is a village in Haft Ashiyan Rural District, Kuzaran District, Kermanshah County, Kermanshah Province, Iran. At the 2006 census, its population was 79, in 21 families.

References 

Populated places in Kermanshah County